Kreković is a Croatian surname that may refer to the following notable people:
Joško Kreković (born 1969), Croatian former water polo player and coach
Karlo Kreković (born 1999), Croatian water polo player, son of Joško
Kristian Kreković (1901–1985), Croatian painter 
Leon Kreković (born 2000), Croatian football forward 

Croatian surnames